Repo Man is a 1984 American science fiction black comedy film written and directed by Alex Cox in his directorial debut. It stars Harry Dean Stanton and Emilio Estevez, with Tracey Walter, Olivia Barash, Sy Richardson, Vonetta McGee, Fox Harris, and Dick Rude among the supporting cast. Set in Los Angeles, the plot concerns a young punk rocker (Estevez) who is recruited by a car repossession agency and gets caught up in the pursuit of a mysterious Chevrolet Malibu that might be connected to extraterrestrials.

A satire of America under the Reagan administration, consumerism and the Atomic Age, Repo Man was developed by Cox in partnership with his fellow film school graduates from UCLA, independent producers Jonathan Wacks and Peter McCarthy. His inspiration for the film came from his own experiences working with repossession agent Mark Lewis. Originally conceiving of it as a road movie, Cox reconfigured the story to take place mostly in Los Angeles to maintain its budget. Michael Nesmith of The Monkees came on board the project as an executive producer, and secured a negative pickup deal with Universal Pictures. Principal photography ran through summer 1983, during which Cox encouraged improvisation from the cast; the film's ending notably differed from what had originally been written. The soundtrack, headlined by a main theme composed and performed by Iggy Pop, is noted as a snapshot of 1980s hardcore punk; Cox wanted the music to underscore the life of repo men.

Despite a troubled initial release due to Universal's skepticism towards the film's commercial viability, Repo Man received widespread acclaim, and was deemed by critics to be one of the best films of 1984. It has since gained a cult following, particularly surrounding Cox's re-edited version of the film for television due to its deliberate inclusion of surreal overdubs to replace profanity. A stand-alone sequel based on an unproduced screenplay by Cox, Waldo's Hawaiian Holiday, was published as a graphic novel in 2008, while a spiritual successor, Repo Chick, was released in 2009.

Plot 
In the Mojave Desert, a policeman pulls over a 1964 Chevrolet Malibu driven by J. Frank Parnell. The policeman opens the trunk, sees a blinding flash of white light, and is instantly vaporized, leaving only his boots behind.

Otto Maddox, a young punk rocker in L.A., is fired from his job as a supermarket stock clerk. His girlfriend leaves him for his best friend. Depressed and broke, Otto is wandering the streets when Bud drives up and offers him $25 to drive a car out of the neighborhood, supposedly for his wife.

Otto follows Bud in the car to the Helping Hand Acceptance Corporation, where he learns the car he drove was being repossessed. He refuses to join Bud as a "repo man," and goes to his parents'. After learning that his burned-out ex-hippie parents have donated the money that they promised him as a reward for graduating from high school to a televangelist, he decides to take the repo job.

After repossessing a flashy red Cadillac, Otto sees Leila running down the street. He gives her a ride to her workplace, the United Fruitcake Outlet. On the way, she shows him pictures of aliens that she says are in the trunk of a Chevy Malibu. She says they are dangerous due to the radiation they emit. Meanwhile, Helping Hand is offered a $20,000 bounty notice for the Malibu. Most assume that the repossession is drug-related because the bounty is far above the actual value of the car.

Parnell arrives in L.A. driving the Malibu, but he is unable to meet his waiting UFO compatriots because of a team of government agents led by a woman with a metal hand. When Parnell pulls into a gas station, Helping Hand's competitors, the Rodriguez brothers, take the Malibu. They stop for sodas because the car's trunk is hot. While they are out of the car a trio of Otto's punk friends, who are on a crime spree, steal it.

After visiting a nightclub, Parnell appears and tricks the punks into opening the trunk, killing one of them and scaring the other two away. Later, he picks up Otto and drives aimlessly, before collapsing and dying from radiation. After surviving a convenience store shootout with the punks that leaves Bud wounded and punk Duke dead, Otto takes the Malibu back to Helping Hand and leaves it in the lot. The car is stolen again, and a chase ensues. By this time, the car is glowing bright green.

Eventually, the Malibu reappears at the Helping Hand lot with Bud behind the wheel, but he ends up being shot. The various groups trying to acquire the car soon show up; government agents, the UFO scientists, and the televangelist. Anyone who approaches it bursts into flames, even those in flame-retardant suits.

Only Miller, an eccentric mechanic at Helping Hand who had explained earlier to Otto that aliens exist and can travel through time in their spaceships, is able to enter the car. He slides behind the wheel and beckons Otto into the Malibu. After Otto settles into the passenger seat, it lifts straight up into the air and flies away, first through the city's skyline and later into space.

Cast

Reception 
Repo Man garnered widespread praise upon its release, and is widely considered to be one of the best films of 1984.  In 2008, the film was voted by a group of Los Angeles Times writers and editors as the eighth-best film set in Los Angeles in the last 25 years. Entertainment Weekly ranked the film seventh on their list of "The Top 50 Cult Films".

Roger Ebert gave the film 3 stars out of a possible 4, and wrote:

Neil Gaiman reviewed Repo Man for Imagine magazine, and stated that "one of last year's cult movie successes was Repo Man [...] and it's not hard to see why. A lobotomised nuclear scientist is driving around Los Angeles in a car with something in the boot. Dead extraterrestrials, a neutron bomb or something even more bizarre?"

The review aggregator Rotten Tomatoes gives the film a 98% approval rating based on 51 reviews, with an average rating of 8/10. The site's critical consensus reads, "Repo Man is many things: an alien-invasion film, a punk-rock musical, a send-up of consumerism. One thing it isn't is boring." On Metacritic, the film received a score of 82 based on 21 reviews, indicating "universal acclaim", and was given the "Must-See" badge.

Accolades 

Academy of Science Fiction, Fantasy & Horror Films
 Won – Saturn Award for Best Supporting Actor – Tracey Walter
 Nominated – Saturn Award for Best Writing – Alex Cox

American Film Institute Lists
 AFI's 100 Years...100 Laughs – Nominated
 AFI's 10 Top 10 – Nominated Science Fiction Film

Soundtrack 

The soundtrack features songs by various punk rock bands such as The Plugz, Black Flag, the Circle Jerks, Suicidal Tendencies, Iggy Pop and others. The film score was created by Tito Larriva, Steven Hufsteter, Charlie Quintana and Tony Marsico of The Plugz. Iggy Pop volunteered to write the title song after his manager viewed a screening of the film.

Sequels

Waldo's Hawaiian Holiday 

Chris Bones saw the script on Cox's website and asked, and received, permission to adapt the script into a graphic novel. The book, Waldo's Hawaiian Holiday, was released in March 2008 by Gestalt Publishing.

Repo Chick 

On December 3, 2008, a sequel was reported to be going into development with the working title Repo Chick. The story would be set in 2008 and the resulting boom in repossession that extends far beyond cars and homes. On February 13, 2009, Cox announced on his blog that shooting had finished and the film was in post-production. The bulk of the film was shot in front of a green screen, with backgrounds filmed and composited-in during post-production.

References

External links 

 
 
 
 
 
 
 
 
 

1980s black comedy films
1980s crime comedy films
1980s science fiction comedy films
1984 comedy films
1984 directorial debut films
1984 films
American crime comedy films
American independent films
American satirical films
American science fiction comedy films
1980s English-language films
Films about drugs
Films adapted into comics
Films directed by Alex Cox
Films set in Los Angeles
Films shot in Los Angeles
Punk films
1980s Spanish-language films
1984 multilingual films
American multilingual films
Postmodern films
1980s American films